Chlorhexidine (CHX) (commonly known by the salt forms chlorhexidine gluconate and chlorhexidine digluconate (CHG) or chlorhexidine acetate) is a disinfectant and antiseptic with the molecular formula C22H30Cl2N10, which is used for skin disinfection before surgery and to sterilize surgical instruments. It may be used both to disinfect the skin of the patient and the hands of the healthcare providers. It is also used for cleaning wounds, preventing dental plaque, treating yeast infections of the mouth, and to keep urinary catheters from blocking. It is used as a liquid or powder.

Side effects may include skin irritation, teeth discoloration, and allergic reactions, although the risk appears to be the same as other topical antiseptics. It may cause eye problems if direct contact occurs. Use in pregnancy appears to be safe. Chlorhexidine may come mixed in alcohol, water, or surfactant solution. It is effective against a range of microorganisms, but does not inactivate spores.

Chlorhexidine came into medical use in the 1950s. Chlorhexidine is available over the counter in the United States. It is on the World Health Organization's List of Essential Medicines. In 2020, it was the 273rd most commonly prescribed medication in the United States, with more than 1million prescriptions.

Uses 
Chlorhexidine is used in disinfectants (disinfection of the skin and hands), cosmetics (additive to creams, toothpaste, deodorants, and antiperspirants), and pharmaceutical products (preservative in eye drops, active substance in wound dressings and antiseptic mouthwashes). A 2019 Cochrane review concluded that based on very low certainty evidence in those who are critically ill "it is not clear whether bathing with chlorhexidine reduces hospital‐acquired infections, mortality, or length of stay in the ICU, or whether the use of chlorhexidine results in more skin reactions."

In endodontics, chlorhexidine has been used for root canal irrigation and as an intracanal dressing but has been replaced by the use of sodium hypochlorite bleach in much of the developed world.

Antiseptic 
CHG is active against Gram-positive and Gram-negative organisms, facultative anaerobes, aerobes, and yeasts. It is particularly effective against Gram-positive bacteria (in concentrations ≥ 1 μg/L). Significantly higher concentrations (10 to more than 73 μg/mL) are required for Gram-negative bacteria and fungi. Chlorhexidine is ineffective against polioviruses and adenoviruses. The effectiveness against herpes viruses has not yet been established unequivocally.

There is strong evidence that chlorhexidine is more effective than povidone-iodine for clean surgery. Evidence shows that it is the most effective antiseptic for upper limb surgery, and there is no data to suggest that alcoholic chlorhexidine increases the risk of tourniquet-related burns, ignition fires or allergic episodes during surgery.

Meta-data spanning several decades shows that the efficacy of chlorhexidine (against organisms that cause surgical site infection) has not changed, dispelling concerns over emerging resistance.

Chlorhexidine, like other cation-active compounds, remains on the skin. It is frequently combined with alcohols (ethanol and isopropyl alcohol).

Dental use 

Use of a CHG-based mouthwash in combination with normal tooth care can help reduce the build-up of plaque and improve mild gingivitis. There is not enough evidence to determine the effect in moderate to severe gingivitis. About 20 mL twice a day of concentrations of 0.1% to 0.2% is recommended for mouth-rinse solutions with a duration of at least 30 seconds. Such mouthwash also has a number of adverse effects including damage to the mouth lining, tooth discoloration, tartar build-up, and impaired taste. Extrinsic tooth staining occurs when chlorhexidine rinse has been used for 4 weeks or longer.

Mouthwashes containing chlorhexidine which stain teeth less than the classic solution have been developed, many of which contain chelated zinc.

Using chlorhexidine as a supplement to everyday mechanical oral hygiene procedures for 4 to 6 weeks and 6 months leads to a moderate reduction in gingivitis compared to placebo, control or mechanical oral hygiene alone.

Chlorhexidine is a cation which interacts with anionic components of toothpaste, such as sodium lauryl sulfate and sodium monofluorophosphate, and forms salts of low solubility and reduced antibacterial activity. Hence, to enhance the antiplaque effect of chlorhexidine, "it seems best that the interval between toothbrushing and rinsing with CHX [chlorhexidine] be more than 30 minutes, cautiously close to 2 hours after brushing".

Topical 
Chlorhexidine gluconate is used as a skin cleanser for surgical scrubs, as a cleanser for skin wounds, for preoperative skin preparation, and for germicidal hand rinses. Chlorhexidine eye drops have been used as a treatment for eyes affected by Acanthamoeba keratitis.

Chlorhexidine is very effective for poor countries like Nepal and its use is growing in the world for treating the umbilical cord. A 2015 Cochrane review has yielded high-quality evidence that within the community setting, chlorhexidine skin or cord care can reduce the incidence of omphalitis (inflammation of the umbilical cord) by 50% and neonatal mortality by 12%.

Side effects 

CHG is ototoxic; if put into an ear canal which has a ruptured eardrum, it can lead to deafness.

CHG does not meet current European specifications for a hand disinfectant. Under the test conditions of the European Standard EN 1499, no significant difference in the efficacy was found between a 4% solution of chlorhexidine digluconate and soap. In the U.S., between 2007 and 2009, Hunter Holmes McGuire Veterans Administration Medical Center conducted a cluster-randomized trial and concluded that daily bathing of patients in intensive care units with washcloths saturated with chlorhexidine gluconate reduced the risk of hospital-acquired infections.

Whether prolonged exposure over many years may have carcinogenic potential is still not clear. The US Food and Drug Administration recommendation is to limit the use of a chlorhexidine gluconate mouthwash to a maximum of six months.

When ingested, CHG is poorly absorbed in the gastrointestinal tract and can cause stomach irritation or nausea. If aspirated into the lungs at high enough concentration, as reported in one case, it can be fatal due to the high risk of acute respiratory distress syndrome.

Mechanism of action
At physiologic pH, chlorhexidine salts dissociate and release the positively charged chlorhexidine cation. The bactericidal effect is a result of the binding of this cationic molecule to negatively charged bacterial cell walls. At low concentrations of chlorhexidine, this results in a bacteriostatic effect; at high concentrations, membrane disruption results in cell death.

Chemistry
It is a cationic polybiguanide (bisbiguanide). It is used primarily as its salts (e.g., the dihydrochloride, diacetate, and digluconate).

Deactivation 
Chlorhexidine is deactivated by forming insoluble salts with anionic compounds, including the anionic surfactants commonly used as detergents in toothpastes and mouthwashes, anionic thickeners such as carbomer, and anionic emulsifiers such as acrylates/C10-30 alkyl acrylate crosspolymer, among many others.  For this reason, chlorhexidine mouth rinses should be used at least 30 minutes after other dental products. For best effectiveness, food, drink, smoking, and mouth rinses should be avoided for at least one hour after use.  Many topical skin products, cleansers, and hand sanitizers should also be avoided to prevent deactivation when chlorhexidine (as a topical by itself or as a residue from a cleanser) is meant to remain on the skin.

Synthesis 
The structure is based on two molecules of proguanil, linked with a hexamethylenediamine spacer.

Brands 
Chlorhexidine topical is sold as Betasept, Biopatch, Calgon Vesta, ChloraPrep One-Step, Dyna-Hex, Hibiclens, Hibistat Towelette, Scrub Care Exidine, Spectrum-4 among others.

Chlorhexidine gluconate mouthwash is sold as Dentohexin, Paroex, Peridex, PerioChip, Corsodyl and Periogard, among others.

Hexoralettene N contains benzocaine, menthol and chlorhexidine hydrochloride. It is used as oral antiseptic candies.

Veterinary medicine
In animals, chlorhexidine is used for topical disinfection of wounds, and to manage skin infections. Chlorhexidine-based disinfectant products are used in the dairy farming industry.

Post-surgical respiratory problems have been associated with the use of chlorhexidine products in cats.

See also 
 Polyaminopropyl biguanide
 Polyhexanide
 Triclosan

References

External links 
 

Antiseptics
Biguanides
Chloroarenes
Disinfectants
Oral hygiene
Otologicals
World Health Organization essential medicines
Wikipedia medicine articles ready to translate